SAGE: A Scholarly Journal on Black Women was a biannual peer-reviewed academic journal which was published by the Sage Women's Educational Press. It was established in 1984 by co-editors-in-chief Beverly Guy-Sheftall and Patricia Bell-Scott. It was "the only journal of its kind devoted exclusively to the experience of black women", and its operations had been completely overseen by black women. The journal was published from 1984 until 1995.

Abstracting and indexing
The journal is/was abstracted and indexed in:

EBSCO databases (America: History and Life, International Bibliography of Theatre & Dance)
Modern Language Association Database
ProQuest (Periodicals Index Online)

Editors-in-chief
The following persons have been editor-in-chief:
Beverly Guy-Sheftall
Patricia Bell-Scott

References

Publications established in 1984
Gender studies journals
Ethnic studies journals
Black feminism
Publications disestablished in 1995
Biannual journals
English-language journals